George Joseph Harris (22 November 1904 – 28 December 1988) was an English cricketer. Harris was a right-handed batsman who bowled right-arm medium pace. He was born in Underwood, Nottinghamshire and was the older brother of famous Nottinghamshire batsman Charles Harris.

Cricket career
Harris represented Glamorgan in a single first-class match in 1932 against Surrey. In his only first-class innings he was dismissed for a duck by Freddie Brown. In the field he took a single catch.

Prior to his only first-class appearance, Harris had represented his birth county Nottinghamshire in a single match in the 1925 Minor Counties Championship which saw the Nottinghamshire Second XI play the Yorkshire Second XI.

Football career
Harris played football for Mansfield town in the 1920s, where he played as a goalkeeper. In the 1925–26 season, the season in which the team came second in the Midland Counties League. Having previously played for Netherfield Rovers,  Harris joined Swansea Town when he moved to Wales, later playing for Briton Ferry Athletic.

Later life
Harris later joined the South Wales Constabulary. He died at Swansea, Glamorgan on 28 December 1988.

References

External links
George Harris at Cricinfo
George Harris at CricketArchive

1904 births
1988 deaths
People from Underwood, Nottinghamshire
Cricketers from Nottinghamshire
English cricketers
Glamorgan cricketers
English footballers
Association football goalkeepers
Mansfield Town F.C. players
Swansea City A.F.C. players
British police officers
Cricketers from Swansea
Briton Ferry Athletic F.C. players